Australaglaspis stoneyensis is an aglaspid that superficially resembles a horseshoe crab, or trilobite. It is known from Idamean-aged strata (Late Cambrian) at Stoney Point in north-west Tasmania.

References 

Aglaspidida
Prehistoric arthropod genera
Prehistoric arthropods of Australia
Invertebrates of Tasmania